The Jay Farrar discography covers recordings with Uncle Tupelo, Son Volt, Gob Iron, and as solo artist.

Albums

Notes
  Uncle Tupelo from 1987 to 1992 included Jay Farrar, Jeff Tweedy and Mike Heidorn
  Uncle Tupelo from 1993 to 1994 included Farrar, Tweedy, Ken Coomer, John Stirratt and Max Johnston
  Son Volt from 1994 to 1998 included Farrar, Heidorn, Jim Boquist and Dave Boquist
  Son Volt from 2005 includes Farrar, Dave Bryson, Andrew Duplantis, Chris Masterson, and Derry De Borja (from 2007)
  Gob Iron includes Farrar and Anders Parker

References
 Discography section on jayfarrar.net

 
Farrar, Jay
Country music discographies
Rock music discographies